An ale-conner (sometimes aleconner or ale-kenner) was an officer appointed yearly at the court-leet of ancient English communities to ensure the quality of bread, ale, and beer, as well as regulating the measures in which they were sold and their prices. There were many different names for this position which varied from place to place: "ale-tasters", gustatores cervisiae, "ale-founders", and "ale-conners". Ale-conners were also often trusted to ensure that the beer was sold at a fair price.

Four ale-conners are still chosen annually by the Common-Hall of the City of London.

History
Ale-conners were sworn "to examine and assay the beer and ale, and to take care that they were good and wholesome, and sold at proper prices according to the assize; and also to present all defaults of brewers to the next court-leet." The mediaeval post of ale conner was far from a popular or sought-after position. Hops are a preservative, so before the introduction of hopping, ale would not keep well and had to be brewed on site, meaning there were many small breweries to visit. In addition, ale frequently "went off" for the same reason, so tasting it was not uniformly pleasant. Finally, as a representative of the authorities and dispenser of fines, an ale-conner could become unpopular in the community. Ale-conners sometimes had to be impressed into service, and the post was often rotated amongst a number of individuals.

Modern-day
The tradition is still maintained in the City of London. The 1911 Encyclopædia Britannica reports:

The officers were historically chosen by the liverymen of London to inspect the measures used in public houses. The title is now a sinecure.

In 2007, Dr Christine Rigden, past Sheriff of London, became one of the four ale conners, the first woman appointed to the position in the City of London in the role's 700-year history.

References

Drinking culture
Beer in England
English traditions